Jason Moore (born 10 October 1988 in Bedford, England) is a motor racing driver.

Career

Karting
Moore began his karting career in 2000 aged 11, with a campaign in the Super 1 National Cadet Championship. Moore finished 24th in the championship, with a best finish of 10th coming at Rowrah.

Moore then moved up to the Super 1 National Junior TKM Championship for three seasons. In 2001, he finished in a lowly 25th place in the championship, with his best finish of 15th coming at the final round at Buckmore Park. The 2002 season was far more successful, as he broke into the top ten, eventually finishing in ninth place. A sixth place at Buckmore was his best result of the season. 2003 was his best season, as he ended up runner-up in the championship, just twenty points behind champion Lee Bell. Moore's season included wins at the first two rounds at Rowrah, and Kimbolton.

Moore stepped up another level to Intercontinental A Junior karts for the 2004 season. He ended up ninth in the championship, with a win at Lydd. Moore continued in the class in 2005, but did not compete in the whole season, pulling out after a troublesome weekend at Clay Pigeon. His best result was 22nd at Three Sisters. His final season of karting produced his only championship win, as he eased to a 21-point winning margin over Micky Higham in the 2006 Super 1 National Formula TKM Extreme Championship, despite only winning one main final at Fulbeck.

Formula Palmer Audi
Moore moved straight into the 450 bhp Formula Palmer Audi series for the 2007 season. He amassed five podiums in his debut season, including four third-place finishes en route to fifth in the championship. Moore continued his progress in the series, by committing to an Autumn Trophy campaign. He recorded his first podium in an FPA car, with a third during the opening race at Brands Hatch.

A second season followed in 2008, and saw Moore successfully claim the championship title. Moore claimed six wins, and finished on the podium a further eight times, as he edged out Tom Bradshaw by nine points. His championship success also saw him being nominated for the McLaren Autosport BRDC Award, but would eventually lose out to Alexander Sims.

Formula Two
2009 saw Moore move up to the FIA Formula Two Championship, driving car number 31. He scored three points en route to 22nd in the championship. He also set fastest lap in the first race at Circuit de Catalunya.

Racing record

Career summary

Complete FIA Formula Two Championship results
(key) (Races in bold indicate pole position) (Races in italics indicate fastest lap)

References

External links
 Career statistics from Driver Database

1988 births
Living people
English racing drivers
FIA Formula Two Championship drivers
Formula Palmer Audi drivers